Terpios is a genus of sea sponges belonging to the family Suberitidae.

Species
Terpios aploos de Laubenfels, 1954
Terpios australiensis Hentschel, 1909
Terpios belindae Rützler & Smith, 1993
Terpios cruciata (Dendy, 1905)
Terpios fugax Duchassaing & Michelotti, 1864
Terpios gelatinosa (Bowerbank, 1866)
Terpios granulosa Bergquist, 1967
Terpios hoshinota Rützler & Muzik, 1993
Terpios lendenfeldi Keller, 1891
Terpios manglaris Rützler & Smith, 1993
Terpios quiza (de Laubenfels, 1954)
Terpios vestigium (Carter, 1880)
Terpios viridis Keller, 1891

References
Terpios at Encyclopedia of Life

Suberitidae
Sponge genera